The 2015 European U23 Wrestling Championships was the first edition of European U23 Wrestling Championships of combined events, and took place from March 24 to 29 in Walbrzych, Poland.

Medal table

Team ranking

Medal summary

Men's freestyle

Men's Greco-Roman

Women's freestyle

References

External links 

2015 in European sport
European Wrestling U23 Championships
Sports competitions in Poland